Night Trap, also known as Mardi Gras for the Devil, is a 1993 supernatural thriller film directed by David A. Prior and starring Robert Davi, Michael Ironside, John Amos, Mike Starr, Lesley-Anne Down and Mickey Jones.

Plot
Veteran cop Mike Turner (Robert Davi) is brought in to help solve a string of baffling satanic homicides. He soon finds himself along with Captain Hodges (John Amos) seeking to catch a murderous psycho called Bishop (Michael Ironside) who's gone on a killing spree during New Orleans' Mardi Gras. Only problem is that this killer has lost his soul to the devil and is no longer human... but a seemingly indestructible demonic being, intent on destroying the lives of everyone around Mike; and shall not stop until he has cost Mike not just his life... but his soul.

Cast
 Robert Davi as Detective Mike Turner
 Michael Ironside as Bishop
 John Amos as Captain Hodges
 Mike Starr as Detective Williams
 Mickey Jones as The Bartender
 Lesley-Anne Down as Christine Turner
 Lydie Denier as Valerie
 Margaret Avery as Miss Sadie
 Lillian Lehman as Mrs. Hodges
 Jack Forcinito (as Jack Verell) as Stevens
 David Dahlgren as Johnson
 Earl Jarrett as Guard
 Keri-Anne Bilotta as Michelle
 Butch Robbins as Driver
 Michael J. Anderson (as Michael Anderson) as Police Officer
 Lynwood Robinson as Police Officer
 Portia Bennett Johnson as Dancer
 John Neely as Face In The Fire
 Douglas Harter (as Doug Harter) as Face In The Fire
 Mario Opinato as Face In The Fire

Critical reaction

Night Trap received mostly negative reviews, with El Juan Shatzer of Bloodtype Online stating that he was disappointed that the talented cast was wasted on a tepid script and flat direction by David A. Prior. However Joe Bob Briggs recommended it with the above quote.

See also
The First Power
Shocker
Night Visitor
The Believers
The Horror Show

References

External links

Worldfest Houston

1993 films
1990s American films
1990s English-language films
1990s mystery thriller films
Action International Pictures films
American mystery thriller films
American neo-noir films
American supernatural horror films
American supernatural thriller films
Films directed by David A. Prior
Films shot in Mobile, Alabama
Films shot in New Orleans